Grover is an unincorporated community and census-designated place (CDP) in Dorchester County, South Carolina, United States. It was first listed as a CDP in the 2020 census with a population of 297.

Its ZIP code is 29477.

History
Grover was named for President Grover Cleveland.

Demographics

2020 census

Note: the US Census treats Hispanic/Latino as an ethnic category. This table excludes Latinos from the racial categories and assigns them to a separate category. Hispanics/Latinos can be of any race.

References

Census-designated places in South Carolina
Unincorporated communities in Dorchester County, South Carolina
Unincorporated communities in South Carolina